Hoyt Ming (October 6, 1902 – April 28, 1985) was an American old-time fiddler.

Biography  
Hoyt Ming was born in Choctaw County, Mississippi on October 6, 1902. Later, in his life he married Rozelle Ming (April 25, 1907 - September 29, 1983); the couple performed together with for the rest of Hoyt's life. He played fiddle with the Pep Steppers, a family old-time band from Tupelo, sometimes billed as "Floyd Ming and the Pep Steppers", instead of using his real name "Hoyt". Hoyt and his band recorded for Ralph Peer and RCA Victor on February 13, 1928 at the Peabody Hotel including their most famous song "Indian War Whoop" which was included on the album Anthology of American Folk Music.  For most of his life he was a potato farmer. He played at local dances and fairs until about 1957, when he stopped playing. Interest in the band revived in the 1970s, and they played at the National Folk Festival in 1973 and at the 1974 Smithsonian Festival of American Folklife as well as other shows. They also appeared in a film, Ode to Billy Joe.

Discography

References

Further reading

 Tony Russell (1976). "Pep Stepping with the Mings". Old Time Music 20 (Spring 1976).
 Marker. http://www.mscountrymusictrail.org/markers/hoyt-ming

1902 births
1985 deaths
Old-time musicians